David Ringot (born May 22, 1969) is a former professional footballer who played as a striker.

See also
Football in France
List of football clubs in France

References

External links
David Ringot profile at chamoisfc79.fr

1969 births
Living people
French footballers
Association football forwards
FC Rouen players
Chamois Niortais F.C. players
Tours FC players
AS Beauvais Oise players
Ligue 2 players
Montluçon Football players
US Joué-lès-Tours players